Pete Sampras Tennis '97 is a tennis video game developed and published by Codemasters. It was released for Microsoft Windows and MS-DOS. It was also released for the PlayStation as Sampras Extreme Tennis. It was endorsed by multiple Grand Slam champion Pete Sampras who appears in the game as an unlockable character. It is the third and final game in the Pete Sampras Tennis series, following Pete Sampras Tennis and Sampras Tennis 96.

Gameplay
Players can choose to compete in an exhibition versus match against the CPU or another human player, or participate in a tournament or knockout mode. In tournament mode, the player selects from one of four unseeded rookies to compete in a world tour. Knockout mode is an eight-player round robin tournament.

Reception

The game received positive reviews upon release. Ed Lomas for Computer and Video Games said "Currently the best PlayStation tennis game available, and one which will appeal to many people. It just doesn't really feel as though you ARE Pete, you're just controlling him."

References

1997 video games
Codemasters games
Cultural depictions of Pete Sampras
DOS games
PlayStation (console) games
Tennis video games
Video games based on real people
Windows games
Video games developed in the United Kingdom